Leire Iglesias Armiño (born 7 April 1978 in Bilbao, Vizcaya) is a Spanish judoka, who played for the middleweight category. She is a five-time World Cup champion, and a silver medalist at the 2008 European Judo Championships in Lisbon, Portugal. She also won two bronze medals for the same division at the 1999 Summer Universiade in Palma de Mallorca, and at the 2003 Summer Universiade in Jeju City, South Korea.

Iglesias represented Spain at the 2008 Summer Olympics in Beijing, where she competed for the women's middleweight class (70 kg). In the preliminaries, she first defeated Brazil's Mayra Aguiar, and eventually upset world champion Gévrise Émane, who was considered a top medal contender in this event. She reached only into the quarterfinal round, where she lost by an automatic ippon to German judoka and Olympic bronze medalist Annett Böhm. Because her opponent advanced further into the semi-finals, Iglesias offered another shot for the bronze medal by defeating Ukraine's Nataliya Smal and Colombia's Yuri Alvear in the repechage rounds. Unfortunately, she finished only in fifth place, after losing out the bronze medal match to Dutch judoka and former silver medalist Edith Bosch, who successfully scored an ippon at three minutes and fourteen seconds.

References

External links
 
 

 NBC Olympics Profile

Spanish female judoka
Living people
Olympic judoka of Spain
Judoka at the 2008 Summer Olympics
Sportspeople from Bilbao
1978 births
Mediterranean Games bronze medalists for Spain
Competitors at the 2009 Mediterranean Games
Universiade medalists in judo
Mediterranean Games medalists in judo
Universiade bronze medalists for Spain
Medalists at the 1999 Summer Universiade
Medalists at the 2003 Summer Universiade
21st-century Spanish women